John Gosselyn was an English Member of Parliament for Lewes 1417, 1420, 1425 and 1429.

References

14th-century births
15th-century deaths
People from Lewes
15th-century English people
English MPs 1417
English MPs 1420
English MPs 1425
English MPs 1429